Stöð 3 was an Icelandic general television channel, owned and operated by Sýn. Founded on September 7, 2013. The channel showcases a wide range of programming from the US and domestic programming. The channel was only available based as a subscription service. All non-Icelandic programming is subtitled.

Programmes 
Almost Human
American Idol
Arrow
Dads
Graceland
Hart of Dixie
Hunted
Raising Hope
Shameless
South Park
Super Fun Night
The Amazing Race
The Carrie Diaries
The X Factor USA
Zero Hour

See also
 Bylgjan
 Fréttablaðið

References

External links
 Official Site

Television channels in Iceland
Companies based in Reykjavík